João Rafael de Brito Teixeira (born 6 February 1994) is a Portuguese professional footballer who plays for Chaves as a midfielder.

He played over 150 games in Liga Portugal 2 for Benfica B and Chaves, as well as playing in the Primeira Liga for Vitória de Guimarães, Vitória de Setúbal and Chaves. He also had a brief spell in England with Wolverhampton Wanderers.

Club career

Benfica
On 13 January 2013, Teixeira made his professional debut with Benfica B in a 2012–13 game against Braga B and played 84 minutes. He scored his first professional goal in a 2013–14 Segunda Liga game against Portimonense on 18 January 2014. He acted mainly as a back-up to Carlos Martins, amassing 28 games in total. He debuted for Benfica in a UEFA Champions League against Bayer Leverkusen on 9 December 2014. On 13 July 2015, he renewed his contract with Benfica until 2021.

Loans
In February 2016, Teixeira joined Vitória de Guimarães on loan for the rest of the season. He made his Primeira Liga debut on 6 March in a 2–0 loss at Académica de Coimbra as a 74th-minute substitute for Licá, and scored his first goal on 8 May in a 4–1 home win over neighbours Moreirense again from the bench. On 13 March, he was sent off before the end of the first half as his team lost by a goal to Paços de Ferreira.

On 2 August 2016, Teixeira joined Wolverhampton Wanderers of the Football League Championship on a season-long loan, making debut four days later as a substitute in a 2–2 draw at Rotherham United. He scored his first two goals for the club on 24 September, in a 3–1 win against Brentford.

After falling out of favour with newly appointed Wolves manager Paul Lambert, Teixeira's loan with Wolves was cancelled and Benfica loaned him out to Nottingham Forest until the end of the season. He made 20 appearances and scored 2 goals in all competitions for Wolves.

For the 2017–18 season, Teixeira was loaned to Vitória de Setúbal in Portugal's top flight.

Chaves
In July 2018, Teixeira signed a permanent four-year contract with Chaves. He was sent off in the opening game of the season only six minutes after coming off the bench, for a high foot on Porto's Sérgio Oliveira in a 5–0 loss on the road; his penalty was upgraded from a yellow to red card by the video assistant referee.

Chaves were relegated in Teixeira's first season, which ended for him in April due to appendicitis. He scored his first goal for them in the second division on 21 September 2019, to open a 3–2 home loss to Covilhã. In December, he suffered a muscular injury in training, and missed some weeks of the season.

Teixeira scored twice on 26 August 2021 in a 3–0 win over Académico de Viseu and was the Liga Portugal 2 Player of the Month in January. Having scored and assisted eight goals each as Chaves won promotion in 2021–22, he made the league's Team of the Year and renewed his contract. He also scored in a 2–0 win over Moreirense in the playoffs on 21 May 2022.

International career
Teixeira earned 56 caps for Portugal at youth levels, starting with a 1–0 win for the under-15s against Bulgaria in Óbidos on 9 April 2009. His first goal was for the under-19s on 13 October 2012, in a 5–0 win over Israel in qualification for the 2013 UEFA European Championship; he was called up for the finals in Lithuania.

Teixeira went with the under-20s to the 2014 Toulon Tournament, in which the Portuguese came third. He scored the first goal of the tournament in a 2–0 win over Mexico on 21 May.

Career statistics

Honours
Individual
Cosme Damião Awards – Revelation of the Year: 2014

References

External links

 
 
 
 National team data 

1994 births
Living people
People from Seixal
Portuguese footballers
Association football midfielders
Amora F.C. players
S.L. Benfica B players
Primeira Liga players
Liga Portugal 2 players
S.L. Benfica footballers
Vitória S.C. players
Wolverhampton Wanderers F.C. players
Nottingham Forest F.C. players
Vitória F.C. players
G.D. Chaves players
English Football League players
Portugal youth international footballers
Portugal under-21 international footballers
Portuguese expatriate footballers
Expatriate footballers in England
Portuguese expatriate sportspeople in England
Sportspeople from Setúbal District